The 1990 Atlantic 10 men's basketball tournament was held as the conclusion to the 1989-90 Atlantic 10 Conference collegiate men's basketball season.

First Round, Quarterfinals, and Semifinals were held on consecutive days from March 3 to March 5, 1990, at the Palestra in Philadelphia, Pennsylvania.

Finals were held on March 8, 1990, at McGonigle Hall in Philadelphia, in which the Temple Owls beat the Massachusetts Minutemen by a two point margin to win the Tournament on home ground.

Temple was the only team to receive an automatic bid to the 1990 NCAA Men's Division I Basketball Tournament. The top six teams in the conference received first-round byes.

Bracket

Trivia 
Although Tournament champions and overall season champions are awarded separately, in the 1989-90 season the Temple Owls won both.

The Atlantic 10 Conference tournament finals have only ever been won by a margin of two points one other time, when the Saint Louis Billikens beat the St. Bonaventure Bonnies in 2019.

References

Atlantic 10 men's basketball tournament
Tournament
Atlantic 10 men's basketball tournament
Atlantic 10 men's basketball tournament
Basketball in Philadelphia